Repton School is a co-educational private school for day and boarding pupils in Repton, Derbyshire, England. The school has around 660 pupils aged between 13 and 18, of whom 451 are boarders. Repton School taught only boys for its first 400 years; Repton started accepting girls in the sixth form early in the 1970s, and within 20 years became completely coeducational.

The following are notable alumni of Repton School:

 Harold Abrahams, 100 m Gold Medallist, 1924 Olympics
 Charles A. Adeogun-Phillips, genocide and war crimes prosecutor
James Airy, cricketer and soldier
Sir Harry Altham CBE, cricket historian, coach and administrator
 James Theodore Bent, FRGS, FSA, (1852–1897), English explorer, archaeologist and author.
 Paul Borrington, cricketer
 Walter Buckmaster, (1872–1942) Polo player (1900 summer Olympics)
 Lieutenant General Gerard Bucknall, (1894–1980) British Army officer who served in  World War I and World War II and commanded XXX Corps during Operation Overlord
 Sydney Carline, (1888–1929), artist.
 Donald Carr, (1926–) Cricketer for Derbyshire and England
 Tom Chambers, actor and winner of Strictly Come Dancing
 Jeremy Clarkson, journalist and ex-presenter of the BBC show Top Gear. Current The Grand Tour host alongside James May and Richard Hammond
 Adrian Newey OBE, Formula One engineer
 John Cornforth, architectural historian
 Jack Crawford, cricketer
 Roald Dahl, author
 Sir James Darling OBE, Headmaster of Geelong Grammar School and chairman of the Australian Broadcasting Commission
 Horace Davenport, first-class cricketer
 Norman Demuth, Classical music composer & writer.
 Anthony Devas, artist.
 George Dodsworth, first-class cricketer
 Blair Dunlop, musician and actor.
 James Fenton, poet
 Sir Maurice Finnes, industrialist
 Sir Henry Firebrace, courtier to Charles I and Charles II
 Walter Franklin, cricketer
 Sir Christopher Frayling, Rector, The Royal College of Art
 C. B. Fry, cricketer
 Lieutenant General Sir Charles Henry Gairdner GBE KCMG KCVO CB (1898–1983), Governor of Western Australia and Governor of Tasmania
 Graeme Garden, comedian, member of The Goodies
 Susie Gilbert, Field Hockey Player, Commonwealth Silver Medallist
 Johnny Gorman, footballer
 Francis Gould, cricketer
Chris Gray (22 May 1942 – 14 May 2009) was an activist in the Situationist International
 Anthony Gross, artist
 Francis Habgood, Police Chief
 Sir Stuart Hampshire, Oxford philosopher
 Jonathan Harvey, composer
 John Holmes, cricketer
 Will Hughes, footballer
 John Hutton, first-class cricketer
 Richard Hutton, England Test cricketer
 Christopher Isherwood, novelist and screenwriter
 Stephen Jones, lead singer of the band Babybird
 Jordan King, British racing driver currently competing in FIA Formula 2
 Herbert Fortescue Lawford (1851–1925) tennis player, Wimbledon champion 1887
 Sir Desmond Lee, classical scholar
 Andrew Li, Queen's Counsel, Former Chief Justice of Hong Kong
 Geoffrey Lumsden, actor in Dad's Army
 William Lumsden, first-class cricketer
 Ewen MacIntosh, actor in The Office
 John Makinson, Chairman of Penguin Random House and The National Theatre 
 Eric Maschwitz, entertainer, writer, broadcaster
 Arthur James Mason, classical scholar and Vice-Chancellor of the University of Cambridge
 Shona McCallin, Field Hockey Player and Olympic gold medalist at the 2016 Summer Olympics
 Derek Mendl (1914–2001), Argentine cricketer
 Jack Mendl (1911–2001), Argentine cricketer and educator
 Charles Armytage-Moore, (1880–1960) founder partner of London Stockbrokers, Buckmaster & Moore (now Credit Suisse Group)
 Alfred Morcom (1885–1952), cricketer and medical doctor
 Edward Oakden, British Ambassador to UAE
Peter Oldfield, SAS commander
Reginald Popham, cricketer and footballer
 Michael Ramsey, Archbishop of Canterbury
 George Rainsford, English actor
 Basil Rathbone, actor most known for playing Sherlock Holmes in the Sherlock Holmes film series
 Denys Rayner, Battle of the Atlantic veteran, writer and boat designer
 Nick Raynsford, Labour MP
 W. A. Robotham of Rolls-Royce
 Sir John Rolleston, Conservative MP
 Kenneth Rose, prize-winning biographer of Lord Curzon, George V and Lord Rothschild; contributed the column Albany to the Sunday Telegraph for 36 years. 
 Ben Sharpe Olympian, Sydney 2000
 Sir John Stanley, Conservative MP
 Johnny Rozsa, fashion, portrait, and celebrity photographer
 Robert Sangster, racehorse owner and breeder author
 John James Scott-Chisholme, Boer war cavalry officer
 Lieutenant-General Sir Frederick Shaw, World War I officer and Commander-in-Chief, Ireland
 Rupert Shephard, English artist
 The Revd Henry Holmes Stewart (1847–1937) 1873 FA Cup winner
 Georgie Twigg, Field Hockey Player Olympic bronze medallist (London 2012) and Olympic gold medalist at the 2016 Summer Olympics
 Edward Upward, novelist and short story writer
 Charles Warner (born 1938), cricketer
 Ellie Watton, Field Hockey Player Commonwealth silver medallist (Glasgow 2014),
 Charles Watts (1905–1985), cricketer and British Army officer
 Denton Welch, (1915–1948) writer and painter
 John Williams (1911–1964), cricketer and solicitor
 Andy Wilman, Top Gear producer (2002–2015), Top Gear (1994–2001) and The Grand Tour (2016 – present)
 Jason Windsor (born 1972), businessman and cricketer
 Nicholas Wood, (1832–1892) industrialist and Conservative MP
 William Wyatt (1842–1908), cricketer and clergyman
 Robert J. C. Young, post-colonial theorist, cultural critic and historian

References 

Boarding schools in Derbyshire
Educational institutions established in the 1550s
Private schools in Derbyshire

1557 establishments in England